Veronika the Maid is a 1951 West German drama film directed by Leopold Hainisch and starring Ilse Exl, Viktor Staal and Ilse Steppat. It was shot at the Göttingen Studios. The film's sets were designed by the art director Walter Haag.

Cast
 Ilse Exl as Veronika
 Viktor Staal as Richard
 Ilse Steppat as Alice
 Paul Hörbiger as Jansen sen.
 Wolfgang Lukschy as Freddy
 Eduard Köck as Joseph
 Anna Exl
 Ernst Auer as Brantner
 Albert Florath
 Erich Ponto
 Gerd Frickhöffer
 Ludwig Auer
 Ilka Hugo
 Tilo von Berlepsch
 August Burger

References

Bibliography 
 S. Jonathan Wiesen. West German Industry and the Challenge of the Nazi Past: 1945–1955. Univ of North Carolina Press, 2004.

External links 
 

1951 films
West German films
German drama films
1951 drama films
1950s German-language films
Films directed by Leopold Hainisch
Adultery in films
Constantin Film films
German black-and-white films
1950s German films
Films shot at Göttingen Studios